Sunny Yuen Shun-yi, also credited as Shun-yee Yuen, is a Hong Kong film actor, stuntman and action coordinator.

Biography
Yuen was the fourth of ten children of the martial artist Yuen Siu-tien. He began training in kung fu with his father from a young age. His elder brothers, Yuen Woo-ping and Yuen Cheung-yan, were also kung fu actors and directors.

Together with his brothers, Shun-yi appeared in many films made by the Yuen clan, which was one of the foremost makers of Hong Kong martial arts films. In the 1970s, he followed his brother Yuen Woo-ping to make films in Taiwan. Although be played a few leading roles in his early career, he was better known for his supporting roles as villains. He made many appearances in the Once Upon a Time in China film series.

Selected filmography
As actor
 Dance of the Drunk Mantis (1979) as Foggy
 The Buddhist Fist (1980) as Shang (lead role)
 Dreadnaught (1981) as White Tiger, a psychotic murderer hiding out in a Peking Opera troupe
 Iron Monkey (1993) as Fox

Awards and nominations
Yuen worked as an action and stunt director in many martial arts films, and was nominated for the Hong Kong Film Award for Best Action Choreography seven times. He won the prize at the 11th Hong Kong Film Awards in 1992 for the film Once Upon a Time in China, together with his brother Yuen Cheung-yan and Lau Kar-wing. In 2018, he was nominated for the Best Action Choreography Award at the 55th Golden Horse Awards for the film Master Z: Ip Man Legacy.

References

External links 
 
 Yuen Shun-yi at HKMDB
 Yuen Shun-yi at HKCinemagic

Living people
Hong Kong male film actors
Hong Kong male actors
Hong Kong stunt performers
Year of birth missing (living people)